Tenggarong  (abbreviated:  TRG  ) is a Kecamatan subdistrict as well as capital City Kutai Kartanegara Regency, East Kalimantan, Indonesia. The Tenggarong area, which is divided into 12 Kelurahan and 2 villages, has a total area of 398.10 km  2  with a population of 114,307 (BPS 2015).

References

Districts of East Kalimantan
Regency seats of East Kalimantan